John Minson AM (6 June 1927 – March 10, 2017) was an Australian radio personality born in Sydney, but moved to Tamworth in 1961 to work as an announcer/copywriter at 2TM and briefly at sister station 2MO in Gunnedah.

Career

The country music program John hosted was one of a number born out of the need for changes designed to meet the challenge of television which commenced in Tamworth on April 10, 1965 and took away most of the station’s night-time (then prime time) advertising revenue. The legend of “Mr Hoedown” was born in 1967 when John Minson changed the name of his Radio 2TM country music program to “Hoedown”.

The show was discovered by listeners in far distant locations – as far as Tasmania and New Zealand in the South, most of Queensland, parts of South Australia, even the islands of New Guinea. Request mail came in, and a strong demand for more time. By the late ‘60s, Hoedown was so popular it was running from 7.30 to 11 and 2TM became the first station to be playing country music every weeknight. By the late ‘60s it was becoming apparent that country music offered big possibilities for 2TM and Tamworth and in 1969, John was one of the group at the radio station who launched the Tamworth, Country Music Capital concept.

Awards
In 1998, John Minson was awarded an AM (Member of the Order of Australia) for service to country music and the entertainment industry and in particular for his contribution in establishing Tamworth as Australia's Country Music Capital.

Australian Roll of Renown
The Australian Roll of Renown honours Australian and New Zealander musicians who have shaped the music industry by making a significant and lasting contribution to Country Music. It was inaugurated in 1976 and the inductee is announced at the Country Music Awards of Australia in Tamworth in January. 

|-
| 1988
| John Minson
| Australian Roll of Renown
| 
|-
| 1994
| John Minson
| Hands of Fame
|

South Australian Country Music Festival Awards

|-
| 1992
| John Minson
| South Australian Country Music Festival Awards
|

Tamworth Songwriters Awards
The Tamworth Songwriters Association (TSA) is an annual songwriting contest for original country songs, awarded in January at the Tamworth Country Music Festival. They commenced in 1986.
 (wins only)
|-
| 1995
| John Minson
| Tex Morton Award
| 
|-

References

Australian radio and television personalities
1927 births
Recipients of the Medal of the Order of Australia
2017 deaths